Staffanstorp Municipality is a municipality in Scania County, southern Sweden. Its seat is located in the town Staffanstorp.

The municipality was formed by the local government reform of 1952, when 12 original units, created out of parishes in 1863, were amalgamated. The next reform in 1971 did not affect the size of this municipality.

In the municipality there are two localities which have grown into suburbs of Malmö: Staffanstorp, with 14,800 inhabitants, and Hjärup, with 4,000 inhabitants, which are both typical residential districts, dominated by detached houses built in the second half of the 20th century. Most residents commute from these areas for work in the nearby cities of Lund and Malmö.

Localities
There were four localities in the municipality as of 2018.

International relations

Twin towns – Sister cities
Staffanstorp is twinned with:

References

External links

 Official site

 
Municipalities of Skåne County